Schizocalyx may refer to:
 Schizocalyx (plant), a genus of plants in the family Rubiaceae
 Schizocalyx, a genus of plants in the family Myrtaceae, synonym of Calycorectes
 Schizocalyx, a genus of plants in the family Salvadoraceae, synonym of Dobera